Sucha Góra (German: Trockenberg, see also other names) is the northernmost district of Bytom, Poland (from 1975; formerly a district of Radzionków and prior to that its own municipality).

History
Sucha Góra was established as a mining colony of Piekary Rudne (Now a part of Tarnowskie Góry) in 1778. Calamine and Dolomite were mined in Sucha Góra.

In 1922, Sucha Góra became a part of Poland following the Upper Silesian Plebiscite, in which 696 people voted to join Poland in Sucha Góra and 116 people voted to remain within Germany.

From 1972 to 1975, Sucha Góra was a district of Radzionków. In 1975 Sucha Góra became a district of Bytom.

Etymology and other names
Sucha Góra means "dry mountain" in Polish.  The town is known as "Trockenberg" in German and as "Trockenbarg" in Silesian German.

In the Alphabetical List of Settlements in Silesia given out in 1830 by Johann Georg published in Breslau (Polish: Wrocław), Sucha Góra is listed in German as "Trockenberg" and in Polish as "Suchogóra".

References

Sources
"Bytom – Sucha Góra". slaskiemiasta.pl. Retrieved October 6, 2020.
"Trockenberg". gov.genealogy.net. Retrieved October 6, 2020.
 Wyniki plebiscytu na Górnym Śląsku. Dziewulski, Stefan. Warszawa 1922.

Bytom
Neighbourhoods in Silesian Voivodeship